Leonard Mullings (born 21 March 1929) was a Jamaican cricketer. He played in five first-class matches for the Jamaican cricket team from 1954 to 1960.

See also
 List of Jamaican representative cricketers

References

External links
 

1929 births
Possibly living people
Jamaican cricketers
Jamaica cricketers
Place of birth missing (living people)